LaVerne Masayesva Jeanne is an anthropologist and linguist at the University of Nevada at Reno, where she is an emerita associate professor.

She received her PhD at MIT in 1978, where she studied with linguist Ken Hale. Together with MIT her classmate Navajo Paul R. Platero, Jeanne is one of the first two Native Americans to have received a PhD degree in linguistics.

Her work has been primarily focused on the Hopi language (her mother language). Her 1978 thesis (supervised by Hale) was entitled Aspects of Hopi Grammar. She also co-authored a heavily cited article in Language with Hale, Michael Krauss, Colette Craig, and others on the state of endangered languages. She was also involved with Hopi revitalization projects.

References

Linguists from the United States
Women linguists
American anthropologists
Native American academics
Native American women academics
American women academics
University of Nevada, Reno faculty
Hopi people
Living people
Linguists of Uto-Aztecan languages
21st-century Native Americans
21st-century Native American women
Massachusetts Institute of Technology alumni
1944 births